Raaz is a 2002 Indian supernatural horror film directed by Vikram Bhatt. The film stars Bipasha Basu in the lead along with Dino Morea and Malini Sharma. Aditya and Sanjana as a couple who have moved to Ooty to save their failing marriage. However, what they find in their new home is more than they expected when a ghost starts haunting the place. The wife, Sanjana, suddenly finds that her husband is part of the ghostly conspiracy, which she must fix to escape. The film is an unofficial adaptation of the Hollywood film What Lies Beneath (2000).

It was the second-highest-grossing film of the year 2002 being the most profitable venture and the first instalment in the Raaz. Basu's performance was highly praised and earned her a Best Actress nomination at the 48th Filmfare Awards. Nadeem-Shravan's music also earned them several Filmfare Award nominations. A sequel to the film was released on 23 January 2009, under the title of Raaz: The Mystery Continues and the third installment of the series titled Raaz 3 was released on 7 September 2012. A fourth film, Raaz Reboot, was released on 16 September 2016.

Plot

In Ooty, a group of college students enjoy a picnic in a forest. One of the girls, Nisha, dies under paranormal circumstances. She had inexplicably attacked her boyfriend like a monster and was rushed to the hospital, where just before dying, her face and voice changed completely, confusing the doctors. Professor Agni Swaroop, who is supposedly an expert in the supernatural is called by police to look into the matter. After investigating, Swaroop declares that she was possessed by an evil spirit. He reveals that this spirit has awakened for a purpose and will not stop until that purpose is fulfilled.

The story turns to Sanjana Dhanraj and Aditya Dhanraj in Mumbai. During a business party, Aditya seems too busy to pay attention to his wife. She leaves the party and on her frantic drive home, she hears a voice in her head and loses control of the car. She manages to escape the accident unscathed. After her recovery, Sanjana asks her husband for a divorce; Aditya, however, realises his fault and suggests a vacation to work out their problems. Sanjana chooses to return to Ooty (where their relationship first began) to save their failing marriage. They stay in the same bungalow behind which Nisha was attacked. Initially, the couple enjoys their stay but Sanjana starts experiencing mysterious things, such as hearing a woman screaming in the forest. On the other hand, Aditya brushes her concern away blaming it all on the sleeping pills that Sanjana is addicted to. From another cleaning staff who visits the house on Aditya's order, she learns that their previous caretaker Robert has not been visiting the home to clean and has disappeared without a trace. Sanjana decides to visit Robert's wife who tells her that he changed and became scared whenever anyone used to mention the guest house. She also told her that he used to hear strange voices from the forest, just like Sanjana, and then suddenly disappeared one day. With the help of their friends, Aditya and Sanjana reconcile.

Sanjana's friend Priya advises her to visit Professor Swaroop after she tells her about these strange incidents. Swaroop arrives and announces the presence of a spirit in the house. Before leaving, he gives Sanjana a lemon and advises her to check upon it after the sunset. If the color does not change, then it means that there is nothing to be worried about, however, if the color changes to red, then there is an evil spirit lurking around. A hysterical Sanjana, upon seeing the lemon turned red, rushes to Aditya who is in mid of a meeting and tells him about their home being haunted. However, Aditya is far from believing this and thrashes the Professor for playing with his wife's sentiments and fear. An urgent phone call from Mumbai forces the couple to go back, but because of the landslide, they get stuck on the highway. Later, they decide that Aditya will fly back to Mumbai alone and will come later to take Sanjana away. After he leaves, Priya insists Sanjana to come with her but she stubbornly denies as she wants to know the truth. The night ends in a horror for her.

The next night, Professor Swaroop revisits the same spot in the forest where Nisha was attacked, accompanied by Priya and Sanjana. On his advice, Sanjana goes alone to talk to the spirit and discovers a revolver. They go to an arms store and are told by the shopkeeper that the revolver was licensed to a retired colonel named Arjun Malik. They visit the colonel's house and learn that the spirit is his daughter, Malini, who was mentally ill and had escaped from the mental asylum several times before suddenly disappearing one day. The colonel tells them that from that day, his revolver had also disappeared.

Sanjana summons the spirit, believing that it wants to tell her something. She learns that Aditya and Malini had an extramarital affair; upon confronting Aditya, he admits the affair and that he had stayed at this very cottage. Aditya had rebuked Malini's demands that he leave his wife and an enraged Malini committed suicide in front of Aditya in order to frame him for murder. Aditya, with the help of Robert, buried the body in the forest.

Sanjana breaks up with Aditya. Swaroop tells her that this was an attempt by Malini's spirit to separate Sanjana and Aditya to take him with her into the afterlife. He believes that the spirit's next step would be to kill Aditya and that they should go to him before Malini attacks him.

Sanjana goes to Aditya and tells him that she is doing this just to save him and that they should leave for Mumbai immediately. It is then revealed that Sanjana is Malini's spirit in disguise. The real Sanjana, Priya, and Swaroop arrive at the cottage, where the bewildered maid tells them that Aditya had just left with her.

Malini's spirit causes their car to fall off a cliff and Aditya is hospitalized. To stop the spirit, Sanjana, Priya and Swaroop enter the forest to locate the girl's body to burn it. Swaroop uses lemon tied to a thread to locate the body, believing that it will turn red when they reach the right spot. Once located, Swaroop returned to the car to get kerosene and matchstick, however, Malini's spirit kills him and takes his form, attacking the two girls. While being pursued, Sanjana finds the dead body of Robert hung on a tree.

With a can of petrol, she burns down Malini's body. In the end, Sanjana and Aditya are reunited.

Cast 
 Bipasha Basu as Sanjana Dhanraj: Aditya's wife, Priya's friend
 Dino Morea as Aditya Dhanraj: Sanjana's Husband and Malini's ex-boyfriend.
 Malini Sharma as Malini Malik / Malini Malik { Evil Spirit Ghost } , daughter of retired Colonel named Arjun Malik; Aditya's ex girlfriend.
 Ashutosh Rana as Professor Agni Swaroop, paranormal investigator who was possessed by malini to kill sanjana.
 Mink Brar as Nisha (ghost appearance) Reborn Disha
 Vishwajeet Pradhan as Ajay, Priya's husband (special appearance).
 Ali Asgar as Rohit, Nisha's boyfriend Died in Raaz Rambo
 Masood Akhtar as Robert: Aditya's servant who was killed by malini.
 Pratima Kazmi as Robert's wife (guest appearance)
 Shruti Ulfat as Priya Comeo role in Raaz Rambo
 Anang Desai as Mr. Dhanraj, Aditya's father (special appearance)
 Neha Bam as Mrs. Dhanraj, Aditya's mother.
 Murli Sharma as Police Inspector (special appearance)
 Ishwar Patel
 Kiran Randhawa
 Yusuf Hussain as Doctor Who Is Treating Nisha

Box office
Raaz released on 1 February 2002 and grossed  and was declared a Blockbuster at the box-office.

Reception
Webindia123.com said that Raaz is "something different from the current trend...Raaz is a psycho-thriller worth a look". The film was praised because of its unique story.

Awards 

 48th Filmfare Awards:

Nominated

 Best Film – Vishesh Films and Tips Industries
 Best Director – Vikram Bhatt
 Best Actress – Bipasha Basu
 Best Music Director – Nadeem–Shravan
 Best Lyricist – Sameer for "Aapke Pyaar Mein"
 Best Female Playback Singer – Alka Yagnik for "Aapke Pyaar Mein"

Music
The music of Raaz was composed by the duo Nadeem-Shravan, while the lyrics were penned by Sameer. Singers Udit Narayan, Alka Yagnik, Abhijeet, Sunidhi Chauhan, Sarika Kapoor, Jolly Mukherjee and Bali Brahmbhatt lent their voices for the songs. It was one of the best selling bollywood soundtrack album of the year and its song gained huge popularity and became huge hits.

Release
The film was dubbed in Tamil as Rahasyam.

References

External links
 
 Planet Bollywood Review

2002 films
2000s Hindi-language films
Indian supernatural horror films
Indian ghost films
Films scored by Nadeem–Shravan
Films directed by Vikram Bhatt
2002 horror films
Unofficial adaptations
Raaz films
Hindi films remade in other languages